Angel Lover is a 2006 Taiwanese television series starring Ming Dow, Bianca Bai, Alex To, Coco Jiang.  It was written by Fang Yi De / An Jin Hong and directed by Danny Dun. It was distributed by Singapore's MediaCorp Studios and broadcast on STAR Chinese Channel from 4 December 2006 to 26 January 2007 at 21:30 for 40 episodes.

Synopsis
At a time when Angelina (Coco Jiang) was at her emotional low-point and was involved in a car accident, a wonderful man named Michael (Tomohisa Kagami) showed up as a doctor and cured her of her broken heart. Michael gave her the confidence and hope to continue living. However, he left shortly after she became ready to love again, and just in time for her to find out that he was a chikan. Michael told Angelina that he had something else more important to attend to, and he wanted her to help others find the right path in their lives and the courage to love again, just like what he did for her.

Thus, Angelina opened up an agency named "Angel Lover" and found five men to assist those women who are troubled with love and lack confidence in life. The protagonist, Yang Tian You (Ming Dow), is also an "Angel Lover", and has a pure heart.

Cast
 Ming Dow as Yang Tian You (楊天佑)
 Bianca Bai as Li Xi Ai (黎希艾)
 Alex To (credited as Alex Tu) as Yu Tai (宇泰)
 Coco Jiang (credited as Co Co) as Angelina
 Ix Shen as MARS
 Remus Kam as Han Shao Xi (韓少熙)
 Tae Sattawat as Sunny
 Tomohisa Kagami as Michael

Extended cast
 Tian Li as Lin Fang Hua (林芳華)
 Janel Tsai as Sun Jin (孫瑾)
 Cheryl Yang as Vivian
 Chamder Tsai as Hao Yun (郝韻)
 Li Jia Ying as Xiao Jing (小靜)
 Da Ya as Xiao Jun (小君)
 Phyllis Quek as Li Shu Yun (李書芸)
 Queenie Tai as Tang Tang (糖糖)
 Huang Yu Rong (Ep 40)
 Zhang Hao Ming as Batman (Ep 1 & 2)
 Na Wei Xun
 Jag Huang
 Albee Huang as Young Lin Fang Hua 林芳華
 Tao Chuan Zheng as Han Shao Xi's father

Soundtrack

Angel Lover Original TV Soundtrack (CD) (天使情人電視原聲帶) was released on December 7, 2006 by Jungiery artistes under Warner Music Taiwan. It contains 18 tracks, in which 12 songs are various instrumental versions of the songs. The opening theme is track 2 "Angel's Eye 發現真愛" by 183 Club, while the closing theme is track 16 "Forgotten 遺忘" by 183 Club. A second version of the soundtrack was released on January 3, 2007 that contained a bonus VCD featuring 4 music videos from the soundtrack.

Track listing

Bonus VCD

Production credits
 Producer: Danny Dun / Pan Jie
 Director: Danny Dun
 Screenwriter: Fang Yi De / An Jin Hong
 Music: Huang Yu Ling

References

External links
  Angel Lover @Star Chinese Channel

Taiwanese drama television series
Star Chinese Channel original programming
Taiwanese romance television series
2006 Taiwanese television series debuts
2007 Taiwanese television series endings